Hexaborane can refer to:
Hexaborane(10) (B6H10)
Hexaborane(12) (B6H12)